Our Beloved Month of August is a 2008 Portuguese film directed by Miguel Gomes.

Reception
As of 31 October 2008, the film has grossed more than €89,000.
It won the Critics Award at the 2008 São Paulo International Film Festival. At the 2008 Valdivia International Film Festival it also won the Critics Award and the award for Best Film.
It was the Portuguese submission for the Academy Award for Best Foreign Language Film in the 81st Academy Awards.

References

External links
 

2008 films
2000s Portuguese-language films
2000s romance films
Films directed by Miguel Gomes
Golden Globes (Portugal) winners
Portuguese romance films
Films shot in Portugal